Velichko or Veličko (Cyrillic script: Величко) is a South Slavic masculine given name and an East Slavic surname. It may refer to:

Surname 
Olga Velichko (born 1965), Russian fencer
Olesya Velichko (born 1981), modern pentathlete 
Vasily Velichko (1860–1903), Russian explorer and editor
Vladimir Velichko (born 1937), served as First Deputy Premier of the Soviet Union in 1991
Yevgeniy Velichko (born 1987), cross-country skier

Given name 
Velichko Cholakov (1982–2017), ethnically Bulgarian Azerbaijani weightlifter
Velichko Minekov (1928–2022), Bulgarian sculptor
Velichko Velichkov (born 1986), Bulgarian football defender
Velichko Velichkov (born 1934), sport shooter

See also
Velichkov
Veličković

Slavic masculine given names
Bulgarian masculine given names
Serbian masculine given names
Russian-language surnames